Tinghu District is one of three districts of Yancheng, Jiangsu province, China. (The other two are Yandu District and Dafeng District). Prior to 2004, Tinghu District was called the Chengqu of Yancheng.

Administrative divisions
In the present, Tinghu District has 9 subdistricts and 6 townships.
9 subdistricts

6 towns

References

www.xzqh.org

External links 

County-level divisions of Jiangsu
Yancheng